Schoenbaum Stadium is a soccer stadium in Charleston, West Virginia located in Coonskin Park. The 6,000-seat stadium is home to West Virginia United of USL League Two.

External links
Kanawha County Parks & Rec - Coonskin Park

Sports venues in West Virginia
Soccer venues in West Virginia
Buildings and structures in Charleston, West Virginia